Ernest Lane may refer to:

 Ernest Lane (surgeon) (1857–1926), British surgeon
 Ernest Lane (musician) (1931–2012), American blues pianist
 Ernest Preston Lane (1886–1969), American mathematician